Wanyandie Flats is a settlement in northern Alberta, Canada within the Municipal District of Greenview No. 16.

Wanyandie Creek flows north into the Smoky River. 

While not regulated under the Metis Act, Wanyandie Flats hosts a Metis co-op.

See also 
List of communities in Alberta
List of settlements in Alberta

References 

Municipal District of Greenview No. 16